Tina Shaw may refer to:

 Tina Shaw (born 1961), New Zealand author 
 T.M. Scorzafava, Italian-American film director